Leguruki is an administrative ward in the Meru District  of the Arusha Region of Tanzania. The ward is home to ober 60 small lakes and is the lake ward of Meru district and also home to the eastern section of Arusha National Park. The ward is bordered to the east by Siha Distric of Kilimanjaro Region. According to the 2002 census, the ward has a total population of 15,678.

References

Wards of Meru District
Wards of Arusha Region